Heteroponera dentinodis is a species of ant in the genus Heteroponera, endemic to Chile and Brazil. It was described by Mayr in 1887.

References

Heteroponerinae
Hymenoptera of South America
Insects described in 1887